Shair is a 1949 Indian Hindi-language film. The film had Dev Anand, opposite Suraiya and Kamini Kaushal in the eternal love triangle.

Cast 
 Dev Anand as Deepak
 Suraiya as Rani
 Kamini Kaushal as Beena
 Agha as Prakash / Parker
 Sulochana (Sr) as Beena's mother
 Shama Dulari as  
 Murad as Beena's Father
 Kamlakant as Rani's Father
 Rekha
 Zia as dancer
 Cuckoo

Songs

References

External links 
 

1949 films
1940s Hindi-language films
Indian romance films
1940s romance films
Indian black-and-white films
Hindi-language romance films